East Newport is an unincorporated village in the town of Newport, Penobscot County, Maine, United States. East Newport has a post office with ZIP code 04933.

References

Villages in Penobscot County, Maine
Villages in Maine